Bob "Brownie" King (January 31, 1934) is a retired NASCAR Grand National Series driver.   He drove in both the 1959 Daytona 500 and the 1960 Daytona 500.  Prior to the creation of the Daytona 500, he drove multiple times in the NASCAR sanctioned Grand National race at the Daytona Beach and Road Course.

In the 1957 NASCAR Grand National Series he finished 9th in the standings.

In 1959, its final year, he finished 5th in the standings in the NASCAR Convertible Division.

In 1962 he won the track championship at Bristol Motor Speedway.

References

External links

1934 births
American racing drivers
NASCAR drivers
Living people
Place of birth missing (living people)